Boundless is the second album by Finnish a cappella ensemble Rajaton, released on October 26, 2001. To reach out to a wider audience, Rajaton released this CD with all but two songs in English.

Track listing
Title (composer / lyricist)
 Butterfly (Mia Makaroff)
 Un-Wishing Well (Heikki Sarmanto / Kim Rich / arr. Jussi Chydenius)
 The Lark in the Clear Air (Jussi Chydenius / Samuel Ferguson)
 We Walk in a Fog (Jussi Chydenius / Eino Leino, translated by Jaakko Mäntyjärvi)
 Lady Madonna (John Lennon & Paul McCartney, arr. Jussi Chydenius)
 Dobbin's Flowery Vale (Irish folk melody, arr. Matti Kallio)
 Summer Song (Michael McGlynn)
 Poison Tree (Laura Sippola / William Blake)
 You Can't Stop Me! (Mia Makaroff)
 Armahan Kulku (The Lover's Path) (Anna-Mari Kähärä / lyrics from the Kanteletar)
 Kaipaava (Longing) (trad. Finnish, arr. Essi Wuorela and Jussi Chydenius)

External links

 Official Rajaton website
 Rajaton - Boundless at Last.fm

2001 albums
Rajaton albums